
Li Qiang is the former Communist party secretary of Shanghai and a member of the Politburo.

Li Qiang may also refer to:

Officeholders
Li Qiang (revolutionary) (1905–1996), former Chinese Minister of Foreign Trade, revolutionary, military engineer, secret agent, radio scientist, and politician
Li Qiang (Lianyungang) (born 1955), former party secretary of Lianyungang City in Jiangsu, dismissed for corruption in 2014

Sportspeople
Li Qiang (athlete) (born 1975), Chinese Paralympic athlete
Li Qiang (canoeist) (born 1989), Chinese flatwater canoeist
Li Qiang (footballer) (born 1998)

Others
Li Qiang (screenwriter) (born 1968), Chinese screenwriter 
Li Qiang (activist) (born 1972), Chinese labor activist
Li Yixiang (born 1973), also known as Li Qiang, Chinese actor

See also
Li Qian (disambiguation)